Fragrant Hills Park or Xiangshan Park (香山公园) is a public park and former imperial garden at the foot of the Western Hills in the Haidian District, Beijing, China. It was also formerly known as Jingyi Garden or "Jingyiyuan" (靜宜園). The name derives from the highest peak of Fragrant Hills, Xianglu Feng (Incense Burner Peak), a  hill with two large stones resembling incense burners at the top.

Name

The syllable xiang in the Fragrant Hills' Chinese name Xiangshan refers to incense, not fragrance per se. This name is perhaps derived from the name of the highest peak Xianglu Feng (香炉峰), literally: "Incense-burner Peak". The bronze-cast incense burner (with remote roots in ritual bronzes) being a common article found in temples. Indeed, incense was also often used as a metonym for temples.

History
The park was built in 1186 in the Jin dynasty (1115 to 1234) and expanded during the Yuan dynasty and Ming dynasty. In 1745, the Qianlong Emperor (1711–1799) of the Qing dynasty ordered the addition of many new halls, pavilions and gardens and gave it a new name, Jingyi Palace (Garden of Tranquility and Pleasure). Many of the relics in the park were damaged by foreign troops during two major attacks. In 1860, British troops set the Old Summer Palace ablaze, burning it to the ground along with the Gardens of Perfect Brightness, causing extensive damage to many relics in the park. Another attack in 1900 by the Eight-Nation Alliance caused destruction to the park and to the Summer Palace built by Empress Dowager Cixi. Since 1949, the Chinese government has been engaged in continuous restoration and development in the area.

Fragrant Hills Park is recognized as one of the major tourist attractions in Beijing. When autumn arrives, the natural scenery in the park turns spectacular, with fiery red smoke tree leaves covering the mountain side. Every year, thousands of tourists ride the cable cars through the park in order see the hills in autumn colors. The grand opening of the annual Red Leaf Festival of Beijing takes place there.

There is also the Fragrant Hills Hotel, designed by Ieoh Ming Pei, which is more traditional than most of his designs.

Routes
There are two main routes through the park. One route goes through the north area, with Spectacles Lake (Yanjing Lake) and the bridge, Study of Reading Heart (Jianxin Zhai) and Bright Temple (Zhao Miao). Study of Reading Heart was built in the Ming dynasty (1368 to 1644) and is a landscaped park inside Fragrant Hills Park. Bright Temple is a large Tibetan style lamasery complex built in 1780 as the residence for the sixth Panchen Lama during his visits to the Qianlong Emperor. Buildings in the complex have partially been burned down. Among the surviving treasures are a majestic glazed-tiled archway in front of the complex, a terrace and a glazed-tiled pagoda. Bells hung on the eaves of the pagoda chime in breeze.

The second route leads through the south area of the park. Main attractions along the route include Tranquility Green Lake (Jingcui Lake), Shuangqing Villa, Fragrant Temple, and Incense Burner Peak. This route is more difficult because it leads across the highest peak, Incense Burner Peak.

Another point of interest in the park is the Shuangqing Villa, once the residence of Mao Zedong and also an early site for the headquarters of the Central Committee of the Chinese Communist Party.

The Temple of Azure Clouds (Biyun Si) is located just outside the north gate of Fragrant Hills Park.

Transport 
Fragrant Hills station

External links 

Fragrant Hills Park. Official site of the Beijing 2008 Olympic Games.

Haidian District
Parks in Beijing